The North Bank tunnel concept was a hydroelectric scheme being developed by Meridian Energy on the Waitaki River in Canterbury, New Zealand.

Discovery of geological faultlines prompted a rethink of the project, including consideration of using a canal instead of a tunnel.

Work on the project was suspended in January 2013 due to a forecast of flat demand for electricity for the next five years. Resource consents for the scheme lapsed in 2016.

This project is at a similar location to Project Aqua, a hydroelectric power proposal abandoned by Meridian in 2004.

Resource consent process 
In December 2008, Environment Canterbury granted water use consents for this project.  Appeals against this decision were made by Ngāi Tahu, Ngāi Tahu Fishers People Inc, the Lower Waitaki River Management Society and Black Point farmer Garth Dovey.  The appeal hearings were held in the Environment Court during June and July 2009, with water rights being granted in September 2009.

See also 

Electricity sector in New Zealand
List of power stations in New Zealand

References 

Hydroelectric power stations in New Zealand
Tunnels in New Zealand
Proposed hydroelectric power stations
Proposed renewable energy power stations in New Zealand
Buildings and structures in Canterbury, New Zealand